Outer Space is Just a Martini Away is the third album from Kalamazoo-based progressive metal band Thought Industry. Released in 1996 on Metal Blade Records.

Track listing
 Love is America Spelled Backwards (Oberlin) 2:42
 Jeb and the Haymaker (lyrics: Oberlin/music: Bryant, Oberlin, Enzio, Lee) 3:05
 Fairy (lyrics: Oberlin/music: Enzio) 4:29
 The Squid (Oberlin) 3:38
 Dante Dangling from a Noose (lyrics: Oberlin/music: Enzio) 2:45
 I'm Jack Frost Junior (lyrics: Oberlin/music: Oberlin, Enzio, Lee) 4:25
 Pinto Award in Literature (Oberlin) 2:10
 Soot on the Radio (Oberlin) 3:51
 Watercolour Grey (Oberlin) 4:58
 Sharron Sours (lyrics: Oberlin/music: Lee) 5:04
 D.I.Y. Tranquilizers (lyrics: Oberlin/music: Lee) 4:11
 Fruitcake and Cider (Oberlin) 2:35
 Atomic Stroller Helps None (lyrics: Oberlin/music: Lee) 1:24
 Bottomfeeder (Oberlin) 5:47

Credits
Brent Oberlin: vocals, guitar, synth, sampling, piano, electronic percussion, acoustic guitar
Christopher Lee: guitar, fretless guitar, piano, acoustic guitar, keyboard
Paul Enzio: guitar, 7 string guitar, classical guitar
Herb Ledbetter: bass guitar, fretless bass
Jared Bryant: drums, percussion, ethnic percussion
Produced by Thought Industry

References

1996 albums
Thought Industry albums